L'Unité pour le socialisme is the main organ of the Socialist Party in Senegal. The magazine is published monthly since 1984. Its headquarters is in Dakar. It is the successor of L'Unité africaine which had been published monthly between 1958 and 1984.

References

External links
 WorldCat record

1984 establishments in Senegal
French-language magazines
Magazines established in 1984
Mass media in Dakar
Monthly magazines
Magazines published in Senegal
Socialist magazines